Isolona deightonii is a species of plant in the Annonaceae family. It is found in Ghana and Sierra Leone. It is threatened by habitat loss.

References

deightonii
Vulnerable plants
Taxonomy articles created by Polbot
Taxa named by Ronald William John Keay